Gerson Tinoco (born 2 November 1988) is a Guatemalan football forward who plays for Liga Nacional club Xinabajul.

International goals
As of match played 6 September 2016. Guatemala score listed first, score column indicates score after each Tinoco goal.

References

External links
 

1988 births
Living people
People from Comayagua Department
Guatemalan footballers
Guatemalan expatriate footballers
Guatemala international footballers
Deportivo Coatepeque players
Cobán Imperial players
Comunicaciones F.C. players
Juticalpa F.C. players
Association football forwards